Park Inn by Radisson, formerly Park Inn or Park Inn International, is a multi-national hotel chain that originates from the United States.

It may also refer to the following notable subjects:

Hotels
 Park Inn Hotel, a historic hotel in Mason City, not part of the hotel chain
 Park Inn by Radisson Berlin Alexanderplatz, a hotel of the Park Inn hotel chain in Berlin, Germany, also known as Park Inn Berlin-Alexanderplatz
 Radha Park Inn, former name of Radha Regent Hotel, Chennai, a hotel of Radha Hotels chain

Media
 The Last Wright: Frank Lloyd Wright and the Park Inn Hotel, a documentary film about the Mason City's Park Inn Hotel.

See also
 Park Inn Hotel stabbings, 2020 stabbing attack in Glasgow, Scotland
 Green Park Inn, a historic hotel, named after Green Park
 South Park Inn, an emergency homeless shelter, named after South Park
 The Omni Grove Park Inn
 Dog Bark Park Inn
 Inn on the Park
 Park Inn (restaurant), the oldest restaurant in Spokane, Washington.